Siopastea is a genus of moths in the subfamily Arctiinae. It contains the single species Siopastea bakeri, which is found in the Philippines.

References

Natural History Museum Lepidoptera generic names catalog

Lithosiini